The Rittenhouse Hotel is a luxury hotel in Philadelphia. The hotel was developed by Greenwood Group. It is a member of the Leading Hotels of the World.

History 
In 1900, railroad tycoon A.J. Cassatt and his wife, Lois Buchanan Cassatt, built on the site. The building was sold to the Episcopal Church of Pennsylvania and was made into their headquarters. Later on, it became the Academy of Notre Dame, a private school for boys and girls. Finally, in the 1960s, the property was slated to become a hotel.

Architect Donald Reiff drew the plans for the building that would become The Rittenhouse. Construction began in the early 1970s. After over a decade of construction, the hotel opened its doors to guests in 1989. The design focused on showcasing the imagery of Rittenhouse Square, angling the windows to offer each room a direct view of the square below. Much of the hotel’s original design is still intact. It has been renovated and modernized since then.

Hotel Description 
The Rittenhouse features 118 guest rooms ranging in size from 450 to 600 square feet and 25 suites ranging from 650 to 2,000 square feet.

References

Hotels in Philadelphia
Rittenhouse Square, Philadelphia
1989 establishments in Pennsylvania
Hotel buildings completed in 1989
Hotels established in 1989